Nicola Fortunato Spano (born March 16, 1976 in Los Angeles, California) is an American acting coach and former actor. Spano is best known for his role as Donnie Stevens in the Disney Channel Original Series Even Stevens and Disney Channel Original Movie The Even Stevens Movie.

His other television credits include 7th Heaven, Alias, Over There, Cold Case, Strong Medicine, Eve, Monk, Moesha, The Wayans Bros., Angel, Beyond the Break and NCIS, as well as co-hosting the syndicated game show Peer Pressure with Valarie Rae Miller.

He attended Don Bosco Technical Institute in Rosemead, California, studying Construction Technology. He is also the founder of the Hollywood Night Market, and Re/creation Café, a community art and music restaurant in Los Angeles.

Filmography
(1994) - Tangents .... Gen Corp. Guard
(1995–1998) - Saved by the Bell: The New Class .... Peter / Travis Wilson ("Prom Dates", "Mind Games") 
(1996) - Sister, Sister .... Matthew ("Big Twin on Campus")
(1996) - 7th Heaven .... Blake ("Saturday")
(1997) - The Journey: Absolution .... Quintana
(1997) - Dangerous Minds ... Soccer Player ("A Different Light")
(1997) - The Burning Zone ... Boby ("Elegy for a Dream")
(1997) - Step by Step .... Gary ("The Kissing Game")
(1997) - Defying Gravity .... Bozzy 
(1997) - Bartender  .... Waiter
(1997–2000) - Moesha .... Hakeem's Friend / Noel ("Keepin' It Real", "The Matchmaker") 
(1998) - Gia .... Gia's brother Michael
(1998) - Melrose Place .... Chris ("A Match Made in Hell")
(1998) - The Wayans Bros. .... Rico Davinci ("The High Life")
(1999) - Body Shots .... Jeff the Doorman
(1999) - The Young and the Restless  .... Chad
(2000–2003) - Even Stevens .... Donnie Stevens 
(2001–2002) - V.I.P. .... Tony Scarnavaco Jr. ("Franco in Love", "Kayus Ex Machina") 
(2003) - The Even Stevens Movie .... Donnie Stevens
(2004) - Angel .... Spinelli ("Why We Fight")
(2004) - Monk .... Officer Salvatore ("Mr. Monk Takes His Medicine")
(2004) - Strong Medicine .... Dr. Schwartz ("Prophylactic Measures",  "Foreign Bodies")
(2005) - Alias .... Brother Angelo ("In Dreams...")
(2005) - Hollywood Vice .... Jake Webster {Kicking & Screaming (Ref 1)
(2005) - Pizza My Heart .... Carlo Delrio
(2005) - Over There .... Trucker ("I Want My Toilets")
(2006) - Cold Case .... Felix Spyczyk - 1928-1929 ("Beautiful Little Fool")
(2006) - Beyond the Break .... Ray Wachowksi ("Sleeping with the Enemy", "Wing Chicks", "Party Wave")
(2007) - NCIS: Naval Criminal Investigative Service .... Marine Sgt. Rudi Haas ("Requiem")
(2008) - Without a Trace .... Eli Simmons ("Closure") 
(2011) - A Great Catch .... SWAT Guy #1

References

External links

1976 births
Living people
20th-century American male actors
21st-century American male actors
Male actors from Los Angeles
American acting coaches
American male film actors
American game show hosts
American male television actors
Don Bosco Technical Institute alumni